Cockburn Cougars is an NBL1 West club based in Perth, Western Australia. The club fields a team in both the Men's and Women's NBL1 West. The club is a division of Cockburn Basketball Association (CBA), the major administrative basketball organisation in the City of Cockburn. The Cougars play their home games at Wally Hagan Stadium.

Club history

Background
Cockburn Basketball Association was established in 1972. The association saw success in the 1980s, with the men's team reaching the grand final of the District Competition in 1982 before going on to win their first premiership in 1984. The women's team meanwhile reached four straight grand finals between 1983 and 1986, losing in close encounters all four years.

SBL / NBL1 West
1989 saw the formation of the State Basketball League (SBL) with both a men's and women's competition. Cockburn, trading as the Cougars, entered a team into both the Men's SBL and Women's SBL. In 1992, the Cougars reached their first MSBL Grand Final and won their first championship with a 107–94 victory over the Souwest Slammers. In 1993, the Cougars made their second straight MSBL Grand Final, where they were defeated 109–91 by the Wanneroo Wolves. In 1998, the Cougars won their first minor premiership with a first-place finish and a 20–4 record. They went on to reach their third MSBL Grand Final, where they were defeated 105–96 by the Slammers.

In 2003, the Cougars finished first in the MSBL's seven-team South Conference with a 16–3 record. They went on to reach their fourth MSBL Grand Final, where they were defeated 76–72 by the Perry Lakes Hawks. Season 2004 saw the men's team claim their third minor premiership with a 21–3 record, while the women's team had their best-ever regular season, as they finished second on the ladder with a 17–3 record.

Success eluded the club until 2012, when the Cougars reached their fifth MSBL Grand Final. There they defeated the East Perth Eagles 105–72 behind a Grand Final MVP performance from import Jeremiah Wilson. In 2016, the Cougars were crowned minor premiers for the fourth time with a first-place finish and a 22–4 record. They went on to reach their sixth MSBL Grand Final, where they defeated the Joondalup Wolves 96–84 behind Grand Final MVP Rhett Della to win their third championship.

In 2021, the SBL was rebranded as NBL1 West.

Accolades
Women
Championships: Nil
Grand Final appearances: Nil
Minor premierships: Nil

Men
Championships: 3 (1992, 2012, 2016)
Grand Final appearances: 6 (1992, 1993, 1998, 2003, 2012, 2016)
Minor premierships: 4 (1998, 2003, 2004, 2016)

References

External links
CBA's official website

Basketball teams in Western Australia
NBL1 West teams
Basketball teams established in 1989
1989 establishments in Australia